Raško Bojić (born December 17, 1964) is a Serbian basketball coach.

Coaching career 
In January 2015, Bojić resigned as a head coach of Borac Čačak. On December 12, 2015, he returns to Borac as the head coach. He resign on April 9, 2018.

References

External links 
 Bojic ABA League Profile
 Coach Profile at eurobasket.com

1964 births
Living people
KK Borac Čačak coaches
KK Borac Čačak players
Serbian men's basketball coaches
Serbian men's basketball players
Sportspeople from Čačak